P.R. Khute (born February 15, 1952 in Sonepur, Raipur district) was a member of the 13th Lok Sabha of India. He represented the Sarangarh constituency of Undivided Madhya Pradesh and is a member of the Bharatiya Janata Party political party.

References

India MPs 1999–2004
1952 births
Living people
Bharatiya Janata Party politicians from Chhattisgarh
Lok Sabha members from Chhattisgarh
People from Raipur district
Madhya Pradesh MLAs 1998–2003